Chomo Lonzo is a mountain in Tibet, 5 km northeast of Makalu in the Mahalungur (Mohalingor) or Khumbu Himalayas. Alternate spellings of the same name include Chomolonzo, Chomolönzo, Chomo Lönzo, Jomolönzo, and Lhamalangcho.

Chomo-Lonzo has three distinct summits. The Southern, main peak (7804m) is joined via a ~ 7250m saddle to the Central peak (7565m), which is joined via a ~7050m saddle to a ~7200m North (or North West) peak.

While from Nepal the mountain is overpowered by nearby Makalu, the fifth-highest peak in the world, the three peaks are a very impressive and dominating sight from the Kangshung valley in Tibet. The 3000 m high northeast face is an obvious challenge that is as yet unsolved. Chomo-Lonzo translates to “bird goddess” and from the East the mountain indeed brings to mind a 3 km high eagle with spread wings.

The French climbers Jean Couzy and Lionel Terray reached the main summit via the gently sloping SW ridge from the 7200m Sakietang La that separates Chomo Lonzo from Makalu. They did this as an afterthought during a reconnaissance expedition to the Makalu, which they first-ascended the next year. The second ascent was only in 1993 by a Japanese expedition which found a route through the NW face that joined the SW ridge half-way. A third and currently last ascent of the main peak in 1994 followed the original SW ridge route.

The Central and North peaks remained unclimbed until 2005. In 1999, an attempt to climb the central peak via its daunting NE pillar was thwarted. In April 2005, a French expedition first explored the NE face but, finding it too challenging, approached the mountain from the West and Northwest instead. One team (Yannick Graziani, Christian Trommsdorff and Patrick Wagnon) climbed the North summit over the NW ridge on May 7, while another (Stéphane Benoist and Patrice Glairon-Rappaz) reached it over the West face on May 16. The first team reascended the North peak and continued to reach the central peak on May 21. The initial plan to traverse all three peaks and descend via the Sakietang La proved impossible.

View

See also
 Chomo Lhari
 Chomo Yummo
 Chomolungma
 Chomolhari Kang

References

External links
 2005 Chomolonzo expedition site
Picture from the West showing all the successful routes
Chomo Lonzo Virtual Aerial Tour

Mountains of Tibet
Seven-thousanders of the Himalayas